Alain Colmerauer (24 January 1941 – 12 May 2017) was a French computer scientist. He was a professor at Aix-Marseille University, and the creator of the logic programming language Prolog.

Early life
Alain Colmerauer was born on 24 January 1941 in Carcassonne. He graduated from the Grenoble Institute of Technology, and he earned a PhD from the Ensimag in Grenoble.

Career
Colmerauer spent 1967–1970 as assistant professor at the University of Montreal, where he created Q-Systems, one of the earliest linguistic formalisms used in the development of the TAUM-METEO machine translation prototype. Developing Prolog III in 1984, he was one of the main founders of the field of constraint logic programming.

Colmerauer became an associate professor at Aix-Marseille University in Luminy in 1970. He was promoted to full professor in 1979. From 1993 to 1995, he was head of the Laboratoire d'Informatique de Marseille (LIM), a joint laboratory of the Centre National de la Recherche Scientifique, the Université de Provence and the Université de la Méditerranée. Despite retiring as emeritus professor in 2006, he remained a member of the artificial intelligence taskforce in Luminy.

Colmerauer won an award from the regional council of Provence-Alpes-Côte d'Azur, and in 1985 the Michel Monpetit Award, from the French Academy of Sciences. In 1986, he was made a knight of the Legion of Honour by the French government. He became Fellow of the American Association for Artificial Intelligence in 1991, and received the Association for Constraint Programming's Research Excellence Award in 2008. He was also a correspondent of the French Academy of Sciences in the area of mathematics.

Death
Colmerauer died on 12 May 2017.

References

External links
 

French computer scientists
Programming language designers
1941 births
2017 deaths
Members of the French Academy of Sciences
Chevaliers of the Légion d'honneur
Academic staff of the Université de Montréal
Academic staff of Aix-Marseille University
Grenoble Institute of Technology alumni
People from Carcassonne
20th-century French scientists
21st-century French scientists
20th-century French engineers
21st-century French engineers